Johannes Mürk (17 August 1874 Vana-Põltsamaa Parish (now Põltsamaa Parish), Kreis Fellin – 21 July 1946 Malmö, Sweden) was an Estonian politician. He was a member of II Riigikogu. He was a member of the Riigikogu since 14 February 1924. He replaced Johann Kesküll.

References

1874 births
1946 deaths
People from Põltsamaa Parish
People from Kreis Fellin
Landlords' Party politicians
Members of the Riigikogu, 1923–1926
Members of the Riigikogu, 1926–1929
Estonian military personnel of the Estonian War of Independence
Estonian World War II refugees
Estonian emigrants to Sweden